These are the official results of the Men's 1500 metres event at the 2001 IAAF World Championships in Edmonton, Canada. There were a total number of 40 participating athletes, with three qualifying heats, two semi-finals and the final held on Sunday 12 August 2001 at 16:00h.

Medalists

Records

Final

Semi-final
Held on Friday 10 August 2001

Heats
Held on Thursday 9 August 2001

References
 Finals Results
 Semi-finals results
 Heats results

H
1500 metres at the World Athletics Championships